The Rivals of Sherlock Holmes is a series of anthologies of detective stories edited by Hugh Greene, a former Director General of the BBC.

Some of the stories were adapted for a television series of the same title, broadcast 1971–1973.

The Rivals of Sherlock Holmes (1970)

More Rivals of Sherlock Holmes (1971)

This volume was published in the United States under the title Cosmopolitan Crimes: Foreign Rivals of Sherlock Holmes.

Further Rivals of Sherlock Holmes: The Crooked Counties  (1973)

The American Rivals of Sherlock Holmes (1976)

Bibliography
 Greene, Hugh; editor.  The Rivals of Sherlock Holmes.  Pantheon Books, 1970; 
 Greene, Hugh; editor.  Cosmopolitan Crimes: Foreign Rivals of Sherlock Holmes.  Pantheon Books, 1971;  
 Greene, Hugh; editor.  Further Rivals of Sherlock Holmes.  Pantheon Books, 1973; 
 Greene, Hugh; editor.  The American Rivals of Sherlock Holmes.  Pantheon Books, 1976; 

Detective fiction
Mystery anthologies